Bayard Delafield Clarkson Sr. (born July 15, 1926 in New York City) is an American physician, hematologist, and oncologist.

Biography
He is the son of the wealthy banker, Robert Livingston Clarkson Sr. (1892–1969), who was the president of Chase National Bank from 1928 to 1929. R. L. Clarkson Sr. and his wife Cora G. Clarkson née Shields (1897–1981) had two other sons, Robert Livingston Clarkson Jr. (1924–1965) and Peter Schuyler Clarkson (1930–1950). The Clarkson family is related to Matthew Clarkson (1758–1825) and is connected to Clark University. When the attack on Pearl Harbor occurred, Bayard Clarkson was attending New Hampshire's St. Paul's School. In December 1943 he enlisted in the U.S. Navy's aviation program. However, he was diagnosed with inactive tuberculosis and judged ineligible for active duty. Thereupon, he joined the American Field Service (AFS). In the summer of 1944, AFS sent him orders for two weeks of basic training, after which he was sent overseas in August 1944. From early September 1944 through March 1945 he served in Italy with Unit CM 90 of the AFS. In the spring of 1945 he volunteered for service in the evacuation of Bergen-Belsen concentration camp. In July 1945, he shipped out from Copenhagen. In autumn 1945 he matriculated at Yale University.

After graduating from Yale, Clarkson studied medicine at the Columbia University College of Physicians and Surgeons, where he graduated with an M.D. in 1952. At New York Hospital (now called Weill Cornell Medical Center), he served his medical internship and residency in endocrinology and hematology. In 1958 he became a Special Lasker Fellow in Clinical Chemotherapy at (what became in 1960) the Memorial Sloan Kettering Cancer Center (MSKCC), where he continued working and coauthoring articles until 2017. AT MSKCC he became in 1970 the Chief of the Hematology Service and in 1980 the Enid A. Haupt Chair of Therapeutic Research. He was from 1975 to 1989 the MSKCC's Chief of the Hematology/Lymphoma Service.

At the beginning of his career of MSKCC he worked with three outstanding chemotherapy pioneers, David Karnofsky, Cornelius Rhoads, and Joseph Burchenal. Clarkson and his colleagues were among the first to develop effective therapies for adults with acute leukemias and lymphomas. Much of his work focused on the search for selectively targetable differences between normal cells and abnormal stem cells that are quiescent (but potentially proliferative) in CML (Chronic Myelogenous Leukemia). He is a leading expert on the "intracellular signaling pathways that are altered by the BCR/ABL fusion genes".

From 1968 to 1992, Clarkson was a trustee of Cold Spring Harbor Laboratory. From 1973 to 1974 he was the president of the American Society of Clinical Oncology (ASCO). From 1980 to 1981 he was the president of the American Association for Cancer Research (AACR).

In 1946 in Keene, New Hampshire he married Virginia Lomax Clark (1926–2019). They had three daughters and one son.

Selected publications

References

External links
 
 

1926 births
Living people
20th-century American physicians
21st-century American physicians
American hematologists
American oncologists
Yale University alumni
Columbia University Vagelos College of Physicians and Surgeons alumni
Memorial Sloan Kettering Cancer Center physicians